Annaba is a district in Annaba Province, Algeria. It is the most populous district in the province. It was named after its capital, Annaba, which is also the capital of the province.

Municipalities
The district is further divided into 2 municipalities:
Annaba
Seraïdi

Districts of Annaba Province